Orville Russell "Obs" Heximer (February 16, 1910 – July 16, 1988) was a Canadian professional ice hockey player who played 85 games in the National Hockey League between 1929 and 1935. Born in Niagara Falls, Ontario, he played with the New York Americans, New York Rangers, and Boston Bruins. The rest of his career, which lasted from 1929 to 1942, was spent in various minor leagues.

Career statistics

Regular season and playoffs

References

External links
 

1910 births
1988 deaths
Boston Bruins players
Boston Cubs players
Canadian ice hockey left wingers
Ice hockey people from Ontario
New Haven Eagles players
New York Americans players
New York Rangers players
Ontario Hockey Association Senior A League (1890–1979) players
St. Paul Saints (AHA) players
Sportspeople from Niagara Falls, Ontario
Springfield Indians players
Canadian expatriate ice hockey players in the United States